Ardana is a village in Cyprus, located 9 km north of Trikomo. It is under the de facto control of Northern Cyprus.

References

Communities in Famagusta District
Populated places in İskele District